Gonzalo Leonel Vivas (born 16 February 1993) is an Argentine professional footballer who plays as a midfielder for Temperley.

Career
Vivas began his career with Nueva Chicago. Despite being on the substitutes bench for a 2012–13 Primera B Nacional fixture with Huracán, Vivas didn't make his professional bow until August 2015 when he played fifteen minutes of a 0–1 win against Crucero del Norte in the Primera División; after promotion in 2014. He participated in further matches versus Lanús, River Plate and Independiente as Nueva Chicago were relegated back to tier two. Vivas scored for the first time in April 2017 against Brown. In August 2020, after over one hundred appearances for Nueva, Vivas was signed by Temperley.

Career statistics
.

References

External links

1993 births
Living people
People from La Matanza Partido
Argentine footballers
Association football midfielders
Argentine Primera División players
Primera Nacional players
Nueva Chicago footballers
Club Atlético Temperley footballers
Sportspeople from Buenos Aires Province